Mount Horne is, at , the highest and most prominent mountain in the Quilty Nunataks, standing  east-northeast of Mount Hassage in Palmer Land, Antarctica. It was discovered by the Ronne Antarctic Research Expedition, 1947–48, under Finn Ronne, who named it for Bernard Horne of Pittsburgh, who furnished wind-proofs and other clothing for the expedition.

References

Mountains of Palmer Land